LeRoy Barry Hughes (November 20, 1905 – December 7, 1991) was an American football and basketball coach and college athletics administrator. He served as the head football coach at Menlo Junior College in Atherton, California (1941–1943, 1946–1949) and California Polytechnic State University in San Luis Obispo, California (1950–1961). He was the head coach at Cal Poly during the California Polytechnic State University football team plane crash in 1960.

Hughes was a member of the University of Oregon men's basketball team from 1927 to 1929. He was hired as athletic director and head football coach at Cal Poly in March 1950.

Head coaching record

College football

References

External links
 

1905 births
1991 deaths
Cal Poly Mustangs athletic directors
Cal Poly Mustangs football coaches
Menlo Oaks football coaches
Oregon Ducks men's basketball players
Junior college football coaches in the United States